Leslie Vincent (September 6, 1909 – February 1, 2001) was an American actor.

Biography 
Born in 1909 as Leslie Fullard-Leo, Vincent grew up in Hawaii and graduated from Punahou School. During the 1930s, he lived in Shanghai for a year and then moved to England, where he worked on the stock exchange. He studied acting at the Royal Academy of London. He appeared in more than 30 films including Forever Amber, Destry Rides Again and Paris Underground.

Vincent's family, the Fullard-Leo family, purchased the Palmyra Atoll (except for some minor islets) on August 19, 1922, for $70,000 from Henry Ernest Cooper, and established the Palmyra Copra Company. The family was involved, decades later, in a lawsuit with the United States government over ownership of the atoll. His heavy involvement in the lawsuit caused Vincent to retire from film. The United States Supreme Court ruled in favor of the Fullard-Leo family in 1947.

Once the lawsuit was settled, Vincent entered the hotel business in Hawaii. He died on February 1, 2001, in Honolulu, aged 91.

Selected filmography
Destry Rides Again (1939)
The Purple V (1943)
Pursuit to Algiers (1945)
Paris Underground (1945)
Deadline for Murder (1946)
Forever Amber (1947)

References

External links

Oral history interview

1909 births
2001 deaths
Male actors from New York (state)
American male film actors
Male actors from Honolulu
Punahou School alumni
Place of birth missing
20th-century American male actors